Disconnection may refer to:

 Disconnection (album), by Strange Parcels, 1994
 The Disconnection, an album by Carina Round, 2003
 "Disconnection" (song), by Music for Pleasure, 1984
 Disconnection (Scientology)

See also
 Connection (disambiguation)
 Emotional detachment, also known as emotional disconnection
 Disconnection syndrome, a neurological condition
 Disconnect (disambiguation)
 Disconnected (disambiguation)
 Disconnected graph, in graph theory
 Disconnected space, the opposite of connected space, in topology